Mien is a lake in southern Sweden, 12 km (7.5 mi) southwest of the town of Tingsryd. The lake is formed within a meteorite crater.

The eroded crater is marked by a 5.5-km (3.4-mi) diameter circular lake (Lake Mien).
The original crater rim is estimated to have been about 9 km in diameter before erosion.
Its age is estimated to be 121.0 ± 2.3 million years (Early Cretaceous).

References

External links 
Google map of 50 largest craters

Impact craters of Sweden
Cretaceous impact craters
Lakes of Kronoberg County
Landforms of Kronoberg County
Impact crater lakes